L'Adroit may refer to:

 French ship L'Adroit - multiple French warships
 L'Adroit-class destroyer